Ibn Masud may refer to:

Abdullah ibn Masud, companion of Mohammed
Urwah ibn Masud, semi-legendary Arabic Thaqifi chieftain of Taif,  companion of Mohammed